Kwon Hyeok-kyu (born 13 March 2001) is a Korean footballer who currently plays as a midfielder for Busan IPark.

In 2021, Kwon was loaned to Gimcheon Sangmu FC for his mandatory military service.

Career statistics

Club

Notes

References

2001 births
Living people
South Korean footballers
South Korea youth international footballers
Association football midfielders
K League 2 players
K League 1 players
Busan IPark players
Gimcheon Sangmu FC players